Jugsalai is a township and business center adjacent to Tatanagar Railway Station, Jamshedpur and a municipality in the Dhalbhum subdivision of the Purbi Singhbhum district in the Indian state of Jharkhand. It is often referred as a wholesale market of Jamshedpur.

Famous people's Of Jugsalai
Thakur Ji Pathak Indian Activist, Politician From Jamshedpur Jharkhand, Born at Uttar Pradesh. 
Ram Chandra Sahis Politician, Ex-MLA Jugsalai Vidhansabha Constituency.

Geography

Location

Jugsalai has an average elevation of 140 metres (459 feet).

Jamshedpur Urban Agglomeration 
With its recognition as an industrial town as early as the 1911 census, Jamshedpur was set on the road of steady population growth, as large number of emigrants flocked in for work opportunities. While in the earlier decades the central nucleus grew, in the later decades towns around Jamshedpur grew rapidly. In 2011, Jamshedpur Urban Agglomeration included 13 urban centres, with a total population of 1.3 million people. However, in more recent years, Jamshedpur UA “has lacked the growth and development observed around other similar industrial towns in western and southern India.” 

Note: The map alongside presents the Jamshedpur Urban Agglomeration. All places marked in the map are linked in the larger full screen map.

Civic administration
The first police station in the area was opened in 1912 at Jugsalai.

Demographics
According to the 2011 Census of India, Jugsalai had a total population of 49,660, of which 26,036 (52%) were males and 23,624 (48%) were females. Population in the age range 0-6 years was 6,115. The total number of literate persons in Jugsalai was 36,773 (84.36% of the population over 6 years). 

(*For language details see Golmuri-cum-Jugsalai block#Language and religion) 

Jamshedpur Urban Agglomeration includes: Jamshedpur (Industrial Town), Jamshedpur (NAC), Tata Nagar Railway Colony (OG), Mango (NAC),  Jugsalai (M), Bagbera (CT), Chhota Gobindpur (CT), Haludbani (CT), Sarjamda (CT), Gadhra (CT), Ghorabandha (CT), Purihasa (CT), Adityapur (M Corp.), Chota Gamahria (CT) and Kapali (CT).

 India census, Jugsalai had a population of 46,061. Males constitute 52% of the population and females 48%. Jugsalai has an average literacy rate of 72%, higher than the national average of 59.5%: male literacy is 77%, and female literacy is 67%. In Jugsalai, 13% of the population is under 6 years of age.

Major festivals celebrations in the Jugsalai area include in Chhath Puja Durga Puja, Makar Sankranti, Deepavali, Kali Puja, Holi, Christmas, Easter, Shab-e-baraat, Ramadan, Eid-al-fitr, Eid al-adha, Mawlid, Muharram.
Hindu is the Majority Religion in Jugsalai.

Infrastructure 
Among the civic amenities, it had  of roads with both closed and open drains, the protected water supply involved tap water from treated sources, tube well/ borewell, overhead tank. It had 8,366 domestic electric connections, 386 road lighting points. Among the medical facilities, it had 1 hospital (with 30 beds), 2 dispensaries, 2 health centres, 1 family welfare centre, 6 maternity and child welfare centres,1 maternity home, 1 nursing home, 2 charitable hospitals/ nursing homes, 1 veterinary hospital, 17 medicine shops. Among social, cultural and recreational facilities, it had 1 cinema theatre, 2 public library, 2 reading room. It had flour mill, oil mill and produced steel almirahs. It had the branch offices of 5 nationalised banks, 1 cooperative bank, 1 agricultural credit society, 2 non-agricultural credit societies.

Main areas
.* Dispensary Road Bhogendra * Mishra Niwas * Ghoda Chowk * Chowk Bazaar * Gouri Shankar Road * Shahid Thakurji Pathak House * Saffi Gang Muhalla * Goushala Nala Road * Bengali Para * R.P Patel School Road * Gouri Shankar Road * Marwari Para * Panchhi Mohallah * Gwala Para * Chaparia Mohallah * Millatnagar * Islamnagar * Chuna Shah Colony * Rahbar Lane * Habibnagar * Gharib Nawaz Colony * Station Road * Mahato Para Road * Kali Asthan Road * Huma Lane * Ram Tekri Road * Nagar Palika Chowk * M.E. School Road * Safihganj Mohallah * Gadhabasa * Girls School Road * Rahmat Lane * Fish Lane * Ghausia Lane * Harijan Basti
.* Patnaiya Colony * D.B. Road * Sachchidanand Mishra  coal Industry * Hussaini Lane  * Chuna Bhatta * Shiv Ghat R* Hill View Area * Raja Ram Badi * Dhobi Lane * Dry Fish Godwon * M.E. School road * River View Colony * P.B.Road * Pareek Bhawan.

References

 

Cities and towns in East Singhbhum district
Jamshedpur
Central business districts in India
Neighbourhoods in Jamshedpur